Luis Artime (born 2 December 1938) is an Argentine former footballer, who played as a striker, and scored more than 1,000 goals during his career. His son Luis Fabián Artime is also a retired Argentine footballer who played in the 1990s.

Club career
Artime was born in Parque Civit in Mendoza Province. He had a remarkably successful career in club football, he was top scorer four times in the Argentine league, three times in the Uruguayan league and once in the Copa Libertadores. He won one Argentine league title, three Uruguayan league titles and the Copa Libertadores in 1971.

Artime started his career at Club Atlético Atlanta but in 1962 he was transferred to Argentine giants River Plate where he became the top scorer in Argentina on three occasions. In 1966 he moved to Independiente where he helped the team to win the Nacional 1967, he was also topscorer in the tournament.

In 1969, he moved to Brazil to play for Palmeiras, but he did not stay long, and soon left to join Nacional of Uruguay. His first spell at Nacional was the most productive of his career; he won three Urugauyan league titles in a row, topscoring in each tournament, and in 1971 he helped the team to win the Copa Libertadores.

In 1972, he tried his luck in Brazil for a second time, but returned to Nacional in Uruguay after only one season at Fluminense. His second spell at Nacional was overshadowed by the successes of eternal rivals Peñarol. Artime retired from football in 1974.

International career
Playing for the Argentina national football team, Artime scored 24 goals in 25 caps, making him Argentina's 8th highest goalscorer to date. His strike rate of 0.96 goals per game for Argentina also makes him one of the most prolific goalscorers in Argentine international football. He played at the 1966 FIFA World Cup and at the South American Championship 1967, where he was the top goalscorer.

Honours

Club
Independiente
 Argentine Primera División: 1967 Nacional

Palmeiras
 Campeonato Brasileiro: 1969

Nacional
 Uruguayan Primera División: 1969, 1970, 1971
 Copa Libertadores: 1971
 Intercontinental Cup: 1971

National Team
Argentina
 Taça das Nações: 1964

Individual
 Primera Division Argentina Top Scorer: 1962 (25 goals), 1963 (25 goals), 1966 (23 goals), Nacional 1967 (11 goals)
 South American Championship Top Scorer: 1967 (5 goals)
 Primera División Uruguaya Top Scorer: 1969 (24 goals), 1970 (21 goals), 1971 (16 goals)
 Copa Libertadores Top Scorer: 1971 (10 goals)
 Copa Intercontinental Top Scorer: 1971 (19 goals)

References

Living people
1938 births
Sportspeople from Mendoza Province
Argentine footballers
Association football forwards
Argentina international footballers
Copa Libertadores-winning players
1966 FIFA World Cup players
1967 South American Championship players
Uruguayan Primera División players
Argentine Primera División players
Club Atlético Atlanta footballers
Club Atlético Independiente footballers
Club Nacional de Football players
Club Atlético River Plate footballers
Sociedade Esportiva Palmeiras players
Fluminense FC players
Argentine expatriate footballers
Argentine expatriate sportspeople in Brazil
Expatriate footballers in Brazil
Argentine expatriate sportspeople in Uruguay
Expatriate footballers in Uruguay